Francis McDonald (born 26 December 1975) is a former Saint Lucian footballer and current manager.

Club career
During McDonald's playing career, he played for Saint Lucian clubs Northern United All Stars and NYAH.

Managerial career
In 2018, McDonald managed former club Northern United All Stars. In October 2018, McDonald was appointed manager of Saint Lucia, before being replaced by Jamaal Shabazz on 5 May 2019.

Managerial Statistics

References

1975 births
Living people
Association footballers not categorized by position
Saint Lucian footballers
Northern United All Stars players
Saint Lucia national football team managers
Saint Lucian football managers